Evangelatos is a surname. Notable people with the surname include:

 Antiochos Evangelatos (1903–1981), Greek composer and conductor
 Costas Evangelatos (born 1957), Greek poet and artist
 Greg Evangelatos, American para-alpine skier

Greek-language surnames